Bob Gage may refer to:

 Bobby Gage (1927–2005), American football player
 Bob Gage (humorist) (born 1966), American writer and humorist